3020 may refer to:

In general
 3020, a number in the 3000 (number) range
 A.D. 3020, a year of the 4th millennium CE
 3020 BC, a year in the 4th millennium BCE

Roads numbered 3020
 Hawaii Route 3020, a state highway
 Louisiana Highway 3020, a state highway
 Pennsylvania State Route 3020 (Dauphin County, Pennsylvania), a state highway
 Texas Farm to Market Road 3020, a state highway
 A3020 road in the UK

Products
 John Deere 3020, a tractor
 NAD 3020, a stereo amplifier
 Tokyu 3020 series, an electric multiple unit train series

Other uses
 3020 Naudts, an asteroid in the Asteroid Belt, the 3020th asteroid registered
 LNWR 2-2-2 3020 Cornwall, a preserved steam locomotive

See also

 , a WWII Kriegsmarine submarine